Kenneth Goodman (December 23, 1927 - March 12, 2020) was Professor Emeritus, Language Reading and Culture, at the University of Arizona. He is best known for developing the theory underlying the literacy philosophy of whole language.

Biography 
Goodman began teaching at Wayne State University in 1962. His research focused on reading in public schools. While at Wayne State University, Goodman developed miscue analysis, a process of assessing students' reading comprehension based on samples of oral reading.  One of his research assistants in miscue analysis was Rudine Sims Bishop.  Goodman taught at Wayne State University for 15 years before moving to the University of Arizona.

After publishing an influential book on the subject of whole language, Goodman began to create a psycholinguistic and sociolinguistic model of reading inspired by the work of Noam Chomsky. Goodman decided that the process of reading was similar to the process of learning a language as conceptualized by Chomsky, and that literacy developed naturally as a consequence of experiences with print, just as language ability developed naturally as a consequence of experiences with language. Goodman concluded that attempts to teach rules ("phonics") to children for decoding words were inappropriate and not likely to succeed.

After developing and researching the Whole Language model, Goodman presented his work to the American Educational Research Association (AERA) conference and published an article in the Journal of the Reading Specialist, in which he famously wrote that reading is a "psycholinguistic guessing game." He retired from the University of Arizona in August 1998.

Theory 
Goodman's concept of written language development views it as parallel to oral language development. Goodman's theory was a basis for the whole language movement, which was further developed by Yetta Goodman, Regie Routman, Frank Smith and others. His concept of reading as an analogue to language development has been studied by brain researchers such as Sally Shaywitz, who rejected the theory on the grounds that reading does not develop naturally in the absence of instruction. Despite this, the theory continues to receive support from some scholars. Goodman's theory and strong convictions made him an icon of the whole language movement and a lightning rod for criticism from those who disagree with it. His book What's Whole in Whole Language sold over 250,000 copies in six languages.

Achievements 
Goodman served in several important capacities, including as President of the International Reading Association, President of the National Conference on Research in Language and Literacy, and President of the Center for Expansion of Language and Thinking. He also worked extensively with the National Council of Teachers of English. He received a number of awards, including the James Squire award from NCTE for contributions to the profession and NCTE (2007). Goodman has published over 150 articles and book chapters as well as a number of books. In addition to What's Whole in Whole Language, he also wrote Ken Goodman on Reading and Phonics Phacts; all were published by Heinemann.  His book Scientific Realism in Studies of Education,  was published by Taylor and Francis in 2007.
His last book was "Reading- The Grand Illusion: How and Why People Make Sense of Print" with contributions from linguist, Peter H. Fries and neurologist, Steven L. Strauss and was published by Routledge in 2016.

Goodman was inducted into the Reading Hall of Fame in 1989.

Publications 

Articles

1963

1. "A Communicative Theory of the Reading Curriculum," Elementary English, Vol. 40:3, March 1963, pp. 290–298.

2. and Yetta M. Goodman, "Spelling Ability of a Self-Taught Reader," The Elementary School Journal, Vol. 64:3, December 1963, pp. 149–154.

1964

3. "The Linguistics of Reading," The Elementary School Journal, Vol. 64:8, April 1964, pp. 355–361.

Also in Durr, (ed.), Readings on Reading, Boston: Houghton, Mifflin, 1968.

Also in Frost, (ed.), Issues and Innovations in the Teaching of Reading, Chicago: Scott, Foresman, 1967.

1965

4. "A Linguistic Study of Cues and Miscues in Reading," Elementary English, Vol. 42:6, October 1965, pp. 639–643.

Also in Wilson and Geyer, (eds.), Reading for Diagnostic and Remedial Reading, Merrill, 1972, pp. 103– 110.

Also in Gentile, Kamil, and Blanchard, (eds.), Reading Research Revisited, Columbus: Charles Merrill, 1983, pp. 129–134.

Also in Singer and Ruddell, (eds.), Theoretical Models and Processes of Reading, 3rd Edition, Newark: IRA, 1985.

5. "Dialect barriers to reading comprehension," Elementary English, Vol. 42:8, pp. 852–60, December 1965. Also in Linguistics and Reading, NCTE, 1966.

Also in Dimensions of Dialect, NCTE, 1967.

Also in Kosinski, (ed.), Readings on Creativity and Imagination in Literature and Language, NCTE, 1969.

Also in Teaching Black Children to Read, Center for Applied Linguistics, Washington, 1969.

Also in Kise, Binter, and Dalabalto, (eds.), Readings on Reading, Int. Book Co., pp. 241–51.

Also in Caper, Green, Baker, Listening and Speaking in the English Classroom, Macmillan, 1971. Also in Shores, Contemporary English: Change and Variation, Lippincott, 1972.

Also in Ruddell, (ed.), Resources in Reading Language Instruction, Prentiss Hall, 1972.

Also in DeStefano, Editor, Language, Society and Education, Jones Co., Worthington, Ohio, 1973.

1967

6. and Yetta Goodman, "References on Linguistics and the Teaching of Reading," Reading Teacher, Vol. 21:1, October, 1967, pp. 22–23.

7. "Word Perception: Linguistic Bases," Education, Vol. 87, May 1967, pp. 539–543.

8. "Reading: A Psycholinguistic Guessing Game," Journal of the Reading Specialist, Vol. 6:4, May 1967, pp. 126–135.

Also in Singer, H. and Ruddell, R.B., Theoretical Models and Processes of Reading, IRA, 1970, pp. 259–272.

Also in Gunderson, D., Language and Reading, Center for Applied Linguistics, Washington, 1970. Also in Harris, A.J. and Sipay, E.R., Readings on Reading Instruction, David McKay, 1972.

Also in Karlin, Robert, Perspectives on Elementary Reading, Harcourt.

Also in Comprehension and the Use of Context, Open University Press, London, pp. 30–41, 1973. Also in Johnson, Nancy, (ed.), Current Topics in Language, Winthrop, 1976, pp. 370–83

Also in Reading Development, Open University Press, London, 1977.

Also in The English Curriculum: Reading I, London: The English and Media Centre, 1990, pp. 21–24.

1968

9. "Linguistic Insights Teachers May Apply," Education, Vol. 88:4, April–May 1968, pp. 313–316.

Also in What About Linguistics and the Teaching of Reading, Scott, Foresman, 1968.

10. "Reading Disability: A Challenge," The Michigan English Teacher, October–November, 1968.

1969

11. "Linguistics in a Relevant Curriculum," Education, April–May, 1969, pp. 303–307.

Also in Savage, Linguistics For Teachers, SRA, 1973, pp. 92–97.

12. "Building on Children's Language," The Grade Teacher, March 1969, pp. 35–42.

13. "Let's Dump the Up-Tight Model in English," Elementary School Journal, October 1969, pp. 1–13.

Also in the Education Digest, December 1969, pp. 45–48.

Also in Linguistics for Teachers: Selected Readings, SRA.

Also in Burns, Elementary School Language Arts, Selected Readings, 2nd Edition, Rand McNally. Also in Harris, J., Handbook of Standard and Non-Standard Communication, Alabama Assistance Center, University of Alabama, 1976.

14. "Language and the Ethnocentric Researcher," SRIS Quarterly, Summer, 1969.

Also in The Reading Specialist, Spring, 1970.

15. "What's New In Curriculum: Reading," Nations Schools, 1969.

*16. "Analysis of Oral Reading Miscues: Applied Psycholinguistics," Reading Research Quarterly, Fall, 1969, pp. 9–30.

Also in Smith, Frank, Psycholinguistics and Reading, Holt, 1972, pp. 158–176.

Also in Emans and Fishbein, Competence in Reading, SRA, 1972.

German translation in Hofer, A., Lesenlernen: Theorie and Unterricht, Schwann: Dusseldorf, 1976, pp. 298-320.

Also in Current Comments, Vol. 21:6, February 6, 1989, p. 20. (Cited as "Classic Citation" in Social Science Abstracts)

17. "A Psycholinguistic Approach to Reading. Implications for the Mentally Retarded," The Slow Learning Child, (Australia), Summer 1969.  Also in Simon and Schuster, Selected Academic Readings.

18. "On Valuing Diversity in Language: Overview," Childhood Education, 1969, pp. 123–126.

Also in Triplett and Funk, Language Arts in the Elementary School, Lippincott.

Dutch translation in Kleuterwereld as "Het Belag Van De Verscheidenbled in de Tall," April 1973, pp. 170–171.

Also in Harris, J., A Handbook of Standard and Non-Standard Communication, Alabama Assistance Center, 1976.

1970

19. and Carolyn L. Burke, "When a Child Reads: A Psycholinguistic Analysis," Elementary English, January 1970, pp. 121–129.

Also in Harris and Smith, Individualizing Reading Instruction, Holt, 1972, pp. 231–243.

Also in Ruddell et al., Resources in Reading-Language Instruction, Prentiss Hall, 1973.

20. "Psycholinguistic Universals in the Reading Process," Journal of Typographic Research, Spring 1970, pp. 103–110.

Also in Pimslear and Quinn, (eds.), Papers on the Psychology of Second Language Learning, Cambridge University Press, 1971, pp. 135–42.

Also in Smith, F., Psycholinguistics and Reading, Holt, 1972, pp. 21–27.

21. "Dialect Rejection and Reading: A Response," Reading Research Quarterly, Summer 1970, pp. 600–603. Also in Selected Academic Readings, Simon and Schuster.

22. and Frank Smith, "On the Psycholinguistic Method of Teaching Reading," Elementary School Journal, January, 1971, pp. 177–181.

Also in Ekwell, Psychological Factors in the Teaching of Reading, Merrill, pp. 303–308.

Also in Fox and DeStefano, Language and the Language Arts, Little Brown, Boston, 1973, pp. 239–43.

Also in Smith, F., Psycholinguistics and Reading, Holt, 1973, pp. 177–182.

German translation in A. Hofer, Lesenlernen: Theorie und Unterricht, Schwann: Dusseldorf, 1976, pp. 232-237.

1971

23. "Promises, Promises," The Reading Teacher, January, 1971, Vol. 24:4, pp. 356–367.

Also in Fox, Language and the Language Arts, Little Brown, 1972.

Also in Malberger et al., Learning, Shoestring Press, 1972.

24. "Who Gave Us The Right?," The English Record, April, 1971, Vol. xxi, 4, pp. 44–45.

25. and D. Menosky, "Reading Instruction: Let's Get It All Together," Instructor, March 1971, pp. 44–45.

26. "Decoding -- From Code to What?" Journal of Reading, April, 1971, Vol 14:7, pp. 455–462.

Also in Fox and DeStefano, Language and the Language Arts, Little Brown, 1973, pp. 230–236. Also in Berry, Barrett, and Powell, Editors, Elementary Reading Instruction Selected Materials II, Allen & Bacon, 1974, pp. 15–23.

1972

27. "Oral Language Miscues," Viewpoints, Vol. 48:1, January, 1972, pp. 13–28.

28. "Reading: The Key Is in Children's Language," The Reading Teacher, Vol. 25, March 1972, pp. 505–508.

Also in Reid, Jesse, and Harry Donaldson, (eds.), Reading: Problems and Practices, 2nd edition, London: Ward Lock Educational Limited, 1977, pp. 358–362.

29. "Orthography in a Theory of Reading Instruction," Elementary English, December, 1972, Vol. 49:8, pp. 1254–1261.

30. "Up-Tight Ain't Right," School Library Journal, October, 1972, Vol. 19:2, pp. 82–84.

Also in Trends and Issues in Children's Literature, New York: Xerox, 1973.

1973

31. "The 13th Easy Way to Make Learning to Read Difficult," A Reaction to Gleitman and Rozin, Reading Research Quarterly, Summer, 1973, VIII:4.

32. with Catherine Buck, "Dialect Barriers to Reading Comprehension Revisited," Reading Teacher, October 1973, Vol. 27:1, pp. 6–12.

Also in Mental Health Digest, December, 1973, Vol. 5:12, pp. 20–23.

Also in Johnson, Nancy, (ed.), Current Topics in Language, Winthrop, 1976, pp. 409–417.

Reprinted as classic article in The Reading Teacher, Volume 50, No. 6, March, 1997, pp. 454–459.

33. and Yetta M. Goodman and Carolyn L. Burke, "Language in Teacher Education," Journal of Research and Development in Education, Fall, 1973, Vol. 7:1, pp. 66–71.

1974

34. "Military-Industrial Thinking Finally Captures the Schools," Educational Leadership, February, 1974, pp. 407–411.

35. "Effective Teachers of Reading Know Language and Children," Elementary English, September 1974, Vol. 51:6, pp. 823–828.

Also in Education Digest, December, 1974.

Also in NJEA Review.

36. "Reading: You Can Get Back to Kansas Anytime You're Ready, Dorothy," English Journal, November, 1974, Vol. 63:8, pp. 62–64.

Also in Reading in Focus, NCTE Newsletter, Australia, October 1976.

1975

37. "Do You Have to be Smart to Read? Do You Have to Read to be Smart?" Reading Teacher, April 1975, pp. 625–632.

Also in Education Digest, Sept., 1975, Vol. 41, pp. 41–44.

Also in ABH Reading Pacesetter, Manila, Philippines, 1975.

Also Spanish translation in Enfoques Educacionales, Chile, No. 5, 1979, pp. 40–47.

38. "Influence of the Visual Peripheral Field in Reading," Research in Teaching of English, Fall 1975, Vol. 9:2, pp. 210–222.

1976

39. "A Bicentenniel Revolution in Reading," Georgia Journal of Reading, Vol. 2:1, pp. 13–19, Fall 1976.

40. "From the Strawman to the Tin Woodman, A Response to Mosenthal," Reading Research Quarterly, Vol. XII:4, pp. 575–85.

41. "And a Principled View from the Bridge", Reading Research Quarterly, Vol. XII:4, p. 604.

42. and Yetta M. Goodman, "Lesenlernen - ein funktionaler Ansatz" in Die Grundschule, Vol. 9:6, June 1977, pp. 263–67.

43. and Y. Goodman, W. McGinnitie, Michio Namekawa, Eikkchi Kurasawa, Takashiko Sakamoto, "Tokubetsu Zadankai: Eizo Jidai ni okero Dokusho Shido" (Reading Instruction in the Era of Visual Imagery) Sogo Kyuiku Gijutso (Unified Educational Theory), Vol. 31.11, pp. 116–25, December 1976, Tokyo.

1977

44. and Yetta M. Goodman, "Learning about Psycholinguistic Processes by Analyzing Oral Reading," Harvard Educational Review, Vol. 40:3, 1977, pp. 317–33.

Also in Constance McCullough, Editor, Inchworm, Inchworm Persistent Problems in Reading Education, IRA, 1980, pp. 179–201.

Also in Thought and Language/Language and Reading, (eds.), Harvard University Press, 1980.

45. "Acquiring Literacy is Natural: Who Skilled Cock Robin?," Theory Into Practice, December 1977, Vol. xvi:5, pp. 309–314.

Also in 25th Anniversary Issue, Theory Into Practice, December, 1987, pp. 368–373.

46. "And Good Luck to Your Boy," Arizona English Bulletin, October, 1977, Vol. 20, pp. 6–10.

1978

47. "Open Letter to President Carter," SLATE, 3:2, March, 1978.

Condensed in Ohio Reading Teacher, January, 1979;

Also in Michigan English Teacher, May, 1978;

Also in Wisconsin Reading Teacher, May 1979; Wisconsin Administration Bulletin, May 1979.

48. "Minimum Competencies: A Moral View," in International Reading Association, Minimum Competency Standards, Three Points of View, 1978.

49. "What is Basic About Reading," in Eisner, Elliot W., (ed.), Reading, The Arts and the Creation of Meaning, National Art Education Association, 1978, pp. 55–70.

50. "Commentary: Breakthroughs and Lock-outs," Language Arts, November–December, 1978, Vol. 55:8, pp. 911–20. Also in Connecticut Council of Teachers of English Newsletter, XII:2, December 1978.

1979

51. "The Know-More and Know-Nothing Movements in Reading: A Personal Response," Language Arts, September, 1979, Vol. 56:8, pp. 657–63.

Also in Georgia Journal of Reading, Vol. 5:2, Spring, 1980, pp. 5–12.

Translation in Danish in Laesepaedogogen 1981 and as Laese Rapport 4 under the title, "Laesning efter mening-eller laesning som teknik," undated.

52. and Yetta M. Goodman, "Learning to Read is Natural," in L.B. Resnick and P.A. Weaver, (eds.), Theory and Practice of Early Reading, Hillsdale, NJ: Erlbaum, 1979, pp. 137–55.

Translation in French in Apprentissage et Socialisation, Vol. 3:2, 1980, pp. 107–23.

Translation in Spanish in Enfoques Educasionales, Chile, 1980.

1980

53. "Revisiting Research Revisited," Reading Psychology, Summer, 1980, pp. 195–97.

Also in Gentile, Kamil, and Blanchard, Editors, Reading Research Revisited, Columbus: Merrill, 1983.

54. "On The Ann Arbor Black English Case," English Journal, Vol. 69:6, September, 1980, p. 72.

55. and Frederick V. Gollasch, "Word Omissions: Deliberate and Non-Deliberate," Reading Research Quarterly, XVI:1, 1980, pp. 6–31. (See also occasional papers.)

1981

56. with Yetta Goodman, "Twenty Questions about Teaching Language," Educational Leadership, March 1981, Vol. 38:6, pp. 437–42.

57. "A Declaration of Professional Conscience for Teachers" Childhood Education, March–April 1981, pp. 253–55.

Also in Learning from Children, by Edward Labinowicz, Addison-Wesley Publishing Company, 1984.

Also in Goodman, K.S., Bird, L., and Goodman, Y., (eds.), The Whole Language Catalog, Santa Rosa, CA: American School Publishers, 1991, inside front cover.

Also in Kaufmann, F. A. (ed.), Council-Grams, Vol. 54:4, Urbana, IL: NCTE, 1991, p. 8.

Also in Society for Developmental Education News, Vol. 2:2, Fall, 1992, p. 6.

Also in Into Teachers' Hands, D. Sumner, (ed.)Peterborough, NH: Society for Developmental Education, 1992, inside front cover.

Also in Whole Teaching, Society for Developmental Education Sourcebook, 6th Edition, Peterborough, NH: Society for Developmental Education, 1993, inside front cover.

58. and Y.M. Goodman, "To Err is Human," NYU Education Quarterly, Summer, 1981, Vol. XII:4, pp. 14–19.

59. "Response to Stott," Reading-Canada-Lecture, April, 1981, Vol. I:2, pp. 18–120.

60. "Lukemisprosessi: monikielinen, kehityksellinen nakokulma" in Jasenlehti, No. 3, (Finland)1981, pp. 8–9.

1982

61. "Revaluing readers and reading," Topics in Learning and Learning Disabilities, Vol. I:4, January 1982, pp. 87–93.

1983

62. and Yetta Goodman, "Reading and Writing Relationships: Pragmatic Functions," Language Arts, May 1983, pp. 590–99.

Also in J. Jensen, (ed.), Composing and Comprehending, Urbana, IL: NCRE/ERIC, 1984, pp. 155–64.

63. "The Solution is the Risk: A Reply to the Report of the National Commission on Excellence in Education," SLATE, Vol. 9:1, September, 1983.

1984

64. and L. bird, "On the Wording of Texts: A Study of Intra-text Word Frequency," Research in Teaching English, Vol. 18:2, May, 1984, pp. 119–45.

65. Growing into Literacy" Prospects, Education Quarterly of UNESCO, Vol. XV:I, 1985. (Also in French, Spanish, Arabic, and Russian translations).

66. Commentary: "On Being Literate in an Age of Information," Journal of Reading, Vol. 28:5, February 1985, pp. 388–92.

Also in Jean M. Eales, Language, Communication and Education, London: Open University and Croom Helm, November, 1986.

67. Introduction to: "A Glimpse At Reading Instruction In China" by Shanye Jiang, Bo Li, The Reading Teacher, Vol. 38:8, April, 1985, pp. 762–66.

68. "Commentary: Chicago Mastery Learning Reading: A Program with 3 Left Feet," Education Week, October 9, 1985, p. 20.

69. "Un programma olistico per l'apprendimento e lo sviloppo della lettura," Educazione e Scuola, (Italy) Vol.IV:15, September, 1985, pp. 11–24. (Also see Occasional Paper No. 1 below).

70. "Response to Becoming a Nation of Readers," Reading Today, October, 1985.

1986

71. "Basal Readers: A Call for Action," Language Arts, April 1986.

72. and Mira Beer-Toker, "Questions about Children's Language and Literacy: an Interview with Kenneth S. Goodman," Mother Tongue Education Bulletin, (Quebec, Canada) Vol. l:2, Spring and Fall, 1986, pp. 19–22.

1987

73. "You and the Basals: Taking Charge of Your Classroom," Learning 87, Vol. 16:2, September, 1987, pp. 62–65.

Also in Manning, G. and M., (eds.), Whole Language: Beliefs and Practices, K-8, NEA: Washington, D.C., 1989, pp. 217–19.

74. "Determiners in Reading: Miscues on a Few Little Words," Language and Education, Vol. 1:l, 1987, pp. 33–58.

75. "Who Can Be a Whole Language Teacher?," Teachers Networking, Vol.1:1, April, 1987, p. 1.

76. "To My Professional Friends in New Zealand," Reading Forum NZ, June, 1987.

77. "The Reading Process: Ken Goodman's Comments," ARA Today, August, 1987.

1988

78. "Look What They've Done to Judy Blume!: The `Basalization' of Children's Literature," The New Advocate, Vol. I:1, 1988, pp. 29–41.

79. "Reflections: An Interview with Ken and Yetta Goodman," Reading - Canada - Lecture, Vol. 6:1, Spring, 1988, pp. 46–53.

1989

80. On writing 'Reading Miscues - Windows on the Psycholinguistic Guessing Game'," Current Comments, Vol. 21:6, February 6, 1989, p. 20.

81. "Whole Language is Whole: A Response to Heymsfeld," Educational Leadership, Vol. 46:6, March, 1989, pp. 69–71.

82. "The Whole Language Approach: A Conversation with Kenneth Goodman," Writing Teacher, Vol. III:1, August–September, 1989, pp. 5–8.

83. "Access to Literacy: Basals and Other Barriers," Theory Into Practice, Guest Editors, Patrick Shannon and Kenneth S. Goodman, Vol. XXXVIIII:4, Autumn, 1989, pp. 300–306.

84. "Latin American Conference is Successful," Reading Today, Vol. 7:3, December, 1989.

1990

85. and Ira E. Aaron, Jeanne S. Chall, Dolores Durkin, Dorothy S. Strickland, "The Past, Present, and Future of Literacy Education: Comments from a Panel of  Educators, Part I," The Reading Teacher, Vol. 43:4, January, 1990, pp. 302–15.

86. "Whole Language Research: Foundations and Development," Elementary School Journal, Vol. 90:2, November 1989, pp. 207–21.

Japanese translation by Takashi Kuwabara in Journal of Language Teaching, Vol. XVII, pp. 99–116, 1990.

87. "Managing the Whole Language Classroom," Instructor, Vol. 99:6, February, 1990, pp. 26–29.

88. "A Rebuttal to Priscilla Vail," WLSIG Newsletter, Spring, 1990, p. 4.

89. "El Linguaje Integral: Un Camino Facil para el Desarrollo del Lenguaje," Lectura Y Vida, Vol. IX:2, June 1990, pp. 5–13.

90. and Dorothy F. King "Whole Language: Cherishing Learners and Their Language," LSHSS, Vol. 21:4, October, 1990.

1991

91. "An Open Letter to President Bush," Whole Language Umbrella Newsletter, Summer, 1991, p. 1-4.

92. and Yetta M. Goodman, "About Whole Language," Japanese (First Language) Education Research Monthly, No. 233, October, 1991, pp. 64–71.

93. and Diane de Ford, Irene Fountas, Yetta Goodman, Vera Milz, and Sharon Murphy "Dialogue on Issues in Whole Language," Orbit, (Canada)Vol. 22:4, December, 1991, pp. 1–3.

94. and Richard J. Meyer, "Whole Language: Principles for Principals," SAANYS Journal, Vol. 22:3, Winter, 1991–92, pp. 7–10.

1992

95. "Why Whole Language is Today's Agenda in Education," Language Arts, Vol. 69:5, September, 1992, pp. 354–363.

96. "I Didn't Found Whole Language," The Reading Teacher, Vol. 46:3, November, 1992, pp.

188–199.

Also in The Education Digest, October, 1993, Vol. 59, No. 2, pp. 64–67.

97. "Gurus, Professors, and the Politics of Phonics," Reading Today, December 1992/January 1993, pp. 8–10.

1993

98. "Phonics Phacts," Nebraska Language Arts Bulletin, Vol. 5:2, January, 1993, pp. 1–5.

1994

99. with Lisa Maras and Debbie Birdseye "Look! Look! Who Stole the Pictures From the Picture Book?," The New Advocate, Volume 7, No. 1, Winter 1994, pp. 1–24.

100. "Standards, Not!" Commentary, Education Week, September 7, 1994, pp. 39 & 41.

Also in The Council Chronicle, Volume 4, Number 2, November 1994, pp. back and 17.

101. "Deconstructing the rhetoric of Moorman, Blanton, and McLaughlin: A response," Reading Research Quarterly, Vol. 29, No. 4, Oct/Nov/Dec 1994, pp. 340–346.

1995

102. "Is whole-language instruction the best way to teach reading?, CQ Researcher, May 19, 1995, Volume 5, No. 19, pp. 457-461.

103. "Forced Choices in a Non-Crisis, A Critique of the Report of the California Reading Task Force" Education Week, Vol. XV, Number 11, November, 1995, pp. 39 & 42.

104. with Elizabeth Noll "Using a Howitzer to Kill a Butterfly": Teaching Literature with Basals, The New Advocate, Volume 8, Number 4, Fall 1995, pp. 243–254.

1996

105. with Yetta M. Goodman, Rev. of "Possible Lives: The Promise of Public Education in America,"Mike Rose, Rhetoric Review, Volume 14:2, Spring, 1996, pp. 420-424.

106. "An open letter to Richard Riley and Bill Clinton", Reading Today, Volume 13, No. 6, June/July, 1996, pp. 39.

107. "The Reading Derby: An Open Letter to Wisconsin Teachers" WSRA Journal, Volume 40, No. 3, Summer/Fall 1996, pp. 1–5.

108. "Educar, como se ense�a a vivir" Interview with Ken and Yetta Goodman, Para Ti, No. 3844, March 11, 1996, pp. 92–93.

109. "Ken and Yetta Goodman: Exploring the Roots of Whole Language" Interview with Ken and Yetta Goodman, by Jerome Harste and K. Short, Language Arts, Volume 73, Number 7, November, 1996, pp. 508–519.

1997

111. "The Reading Process: Insights from Miscue Analysis" A Summary adapted from The 1996-97 Dean's Forum, The Advancement of Knowledge and Practice in Education Proceedings, University of Arizona, Tucson, January, 1997.

112. “California, Whole Language, and the NAEP” CLIPS, Volume 3, Number 1, Spring, 1997, pp. 53–56.

113. "Capturing 'America Reads' For a Larger Agenda?" Education Week, Volume XVII, Number 4, September, 1997, pp. 34–35.

114. “Putting Theory and Research in the Context of History” Language Arts, Volume 74, Number 8, December, 1997, pp. 595–599.

1998

115. “Parental Choice bill requires a state-mandated curriculum” Guest Comment, Arizona Daily Star, February 20, 1998, Section A, p. 11.

116. “Good News from a Bad Test: Arizona, California and the National Assessment” Arizona Reading Journal, Vol XXV, No. 1 Spring/Summer, 1998, pp. 13–23.

117. “The Phing Points, Volume 11, Number 2, April/May, 2000, pp. 18-19.

126. “Teaching Amid the Rocket’s Red Glare” Minnesota English Journal, Fall, 2000, pp. 107–110.

127. “Defending Teachers and Learners from Mandates” Minnesota English Journal, Fall, 2000, pp. 111–114.

128. With Paulson, Eric J., “Influential Studies in Eye-Movement Research,” Reading Online, The International Reading Association's Electronic Journal. December, 1998. www.readingonline.org/research/eyemove.html

129. “On Reading” (6) The Science of Reading, Tokyo, Japan: The Japan Reading Association, Vol July, 2000, Japanese Translation, (Yokota,Rayco translator), pp. 73–82.

130. “On Reading” (7) The Science of Reading, Tokyo, Japan: The Japan Reading Association, Vol. 44, No. 3, October, 2000, Japanese Translation, (Yokota, Rayco translator), pp. 83–104.

2001

131 “Aims” Tucson, AZ: Arizona Daily Star, Sunday, October 28, 2001 (Guest Opinion), p.B-11.

132. “On Reading” (8) The Science of Reading, Tokyo, Japan: The Japan Reading Association, Vol. 45, No. 3, October, 2001, Japanese Translation, (Yokota, Rayco translator), pp. 103–125.

2003

133. “A Declaration of Professional Conscience for Teacher Educators” Practically Primary, Vol. 8, Number 3, October 2003, Australian Literacy Educators’ Association, pp. 5–6.

2004

134. “Introduction,” Colombian Applied Linguistics Journal, Special Issue on Literacy Processes, Number 6, Sept. 2004, p. 4-5.

135. “Perspectiva transaccional sociopsyicolinguistica de la lectura y la escritura,” Revista Lectura y Vida, Textos en Contexto, No. 2, Buenos Aires, Argentina: Asociacion Internacional de Lectura, December, 2004.

2005

136. “Making Sense of Written Language: A Lifelong Journey”, Journal of Literacy Research Vol 37 No. 1 Spring 2005

Books and Monographs

1. with Hans Olsen, Cynthia Colvin, Louis Vanderlinde, Choosing Materials to Teach Readings, Detroit: Wayne State University Press, 1966. Second edition, 1973.

2. (ed.), The Psycholinguistic Nature of the Reading Process, Detroit: Wayne State University Press, 1968. Second Printing, 1973.

Lead article translation in German, A. Hofer, Lesenlernen: Theorie und Unterricht, Schwann: Dusseldorf, 1976, pp. 139-51.

3. and J. Fleming, (eds.), Psycholinguistics and the Teaching of Reading, Newark, International Reading Association, 1969.

4. and Olive Niles, Reading: Process and Program, Champaign, IL: NCTE, 1969, (monograph).

Excerpt in Reading: Today and Tomorrow, London: Open University, 1972.

Also in Singer and Ruddell, Theoretical Models and Processes in Reading, Second edition, Neward, DE: IRA, 1976.

Also in German edition of Theoretical Models, M. Angermaier.

5. with E. Brooks Smith, and Robert Meredith, Language and Thinking in the Elementary School, Holt, Rinehart and Winston, 1970.

Chapter reprinted in "Resources in Reading-Language Instruction," Ruddell, (ed.), Prentice Hall, 1973. 2nd edition of Language and Thinking in School, 1976.

3rd edition, with E. B. Smith, R. Meredith, and Y. Goodman, Language and Thinking in School, A Whole-Language Curriculum, New York: Richard C. Owen, 1987.

6. and Yetta M. Goodman, Annotated Bibliography on Linguistics, Psycholinguistics and the Teaching of Reading, Newark, DE: International Reading Association, 1972. 3rd edition, 1980.

7. editor, Miscue Analysis: Applications to Reading Instruction, NCTE-ERIC, 1973.

Excerpt in: Plackett, E. (ed.), The English Curriculum: Reading 2, Slow Readers, London: The English Centre, 1990, pp. 79–83.

8. Reading: A Conversation with Kenneth Goodman, Chicago: Scott, Foresman, 1976.

Digest in TSI Repeater-Cable, Telesensory Systems, Palo Alto, September, 1977.

9. with Yetta Goodman and Barbara Flores, Reading in the Bilingual Classroom: Literacy and Biliteracy, National Clearinghouse for Bilingual Education, Rosslyn, Virginia, 1979.

10. Reading and Readers, (The 1981 Catherine Molony Memorial Lecture), New York, City College School of Education, Workshop Center for Open Education, 1981.

11. Language and Literacy, The Selected Writings of Kenneth S. Goodman, Volume 1: Process, Theory, Research, (eds.), Frederick V. Gollasch, Boston & London: Routledge and Kegan Paul, 1982.

12. Language and Literacy, The Selected Writings of Kenneth S. Goodman, Volume II: Reading, Language and the Classroom Teacher, (eds.), F.V. Gollasch, Boston and London Routledge and Kegan Paul, 1982.

13. What's Whole in Whole Language, Richmond Hill, Toronto: Scholastic Lmtd., 1986, and Portsmouth, NH: Heinemann Educational.

Spanish edition, Lenguaje Integral, Editorial Venezolana C.A., 1989;

French edition, Le Comment et Pourqois de la Language Integre, Scholastic, 1989;

Japanese edition Kyoku e no atarashi chosen: Eigo ken ni okeri zentai gengo kyoiku, Tokyo: Ozora Sha, 1990.

Spanish edition, El lenguaje integral, Aique Grupo Editor, S.A.: Libro De Edici�n Argentina, 1995.

Portuguese edition, Linguagem Integral, Traducao: Marcos A.G. Domingues, Porto Alegre: Artes Medicas, 1997.

14. with Patrick Shannon, Yvonne Freeman and Sharon Murphy, Report Card on Basal Readers, Katonah, NY: R.C. Owen, 1988.

15. with Yetta Goodman and Wendy Hood, The Whole Language Evaluation Book, Portsmouth, NH: Heineman, 1989.

16. with Yetta Goodman and Wendy Hood, Organizing for Whole Language, Portsmouth, NH: Heinemann, 1991.

17. with Lois Bird and Yetta Goodman, The Whole Language Catalog, American School Publishers, January, 1991.

18. Eminent Scholar Conversation #15 by Rudine Sims Bishop, Ohio State University: Martha L. King Language and Literacy Center, 1991, pp. 1–35.

19. with Lois B. Bird and Yetta Goodman, The Whole Language Catalog: Authentic Assessment Supplement, Santa Rosa, CA: American School Publishers, May 1992.

20. Ken Goodman Phonics Phacts, Richmond Hill, Ontario: Scholastic Canada, Ltd (Canada), and Heinemann (US) Portsmouth, NH, 1994.

21. with Lois Bird and Yetta Goodman, The Whole Language Catalog: Forms for Authentic Assessment, New York, NY: SRA Division McMillan/McGraw-Hill School Publishing Company, 1994.

22. with Patrick Shannon, Basal Readers, A Second Look, Katonah, NY: Richard C. Owen, 1994

23. Ken Goodman On Reading, Richmond Hill, Ontario: Scholastic Canada, Ltd. (Canada), and Heinemann (US) Portsmouth, NH, 1996.

24. with Joel Brown and Ann M. Marek, Studies in Miscue Analysis: An Annotated bibliography, Newark, DE: International Reading Association, 1996.

25. In Defense of Good Teaching, Kenneth S. Goodman (ed.), York, ME: Stenhouse Publishers, 1998.

26. Reflections and Connections: Essays in Honor of Kenneth S. Goodman's Influence on Language Education, Marek, Ann M. & Carole Edelsky (eds.), Cresskill, NJ: Hampton Press, Inc., 1998

27. On the Revolution of Reading, The Selected Writings of Kenneth S. Goodman (Alan D. Flurkey and Xu, Jingguo (Eds.), Portsmouth, NH: Heinemann, 2003.

28. with. Shannon, P., Goodman, Y. and Rapoport, R. (eds.), Saving Our Schools, Berkeley, CA: RDR Books, 2004.

29 . Examining DIBELS, Vermont Society for the Study of Education in press

Book Chapters

1. "A Psycholinguistic View of Reading Comprehension," New Frontiers in College-Adult Reading, 15th Yearbook of the National Reading Conference, Milwaukee, 1966.

2. "Elementary Education," Foundations of Education, revised edition, George Kneller, (ed.), New York: John Wiley and Sons, 1967, pp. 493–521.

3. "Is the Linguistic Approach an Improvement in Reading Instruction: Pro," Nila Banton Smith, (ed.), Current Issues in Reading, Newark, DE: IRA, 1969, pp. 268–276.

4. "Words and Morphemes in Reading," Psycholinguistics and the Teaching of Reading, Goodman and J. Fleming, (eds.), Newark, DE: IRA, 1969, pp. 25–33.

5. "The Interrelationships Between Language Development and Learning to Read," The Impact of Society on Learning to Read, Miriam Schleich, (ed.), Hofstra University, 1970.

6. "Comprehension-Centered Reading Instruction," Proceedings of the 1970 Claremont Reading Conference, pp. 125–135. Also in Ekwell, Psychological Factors in the Teaching of Reading, Merrill, 1972, pp. 292–302.

7. "Psycholinguistics in Reading," Innovations in the Elementary School: An IDEA, occasional paper, Melbourne, FL, 1970.

8. "Urban Dialects and Reading Instruction," Kender, J.P., (ed.), Teaching Reading—Not By Decoding Alone, Interstate: Danville, 1971, pp. 61–75.

9. "The Search Called Reading," Coordinating Reading Instruction, Helen Robinson, (ed.), Scott Foresman, Glenview, 1971, pp. 8–14.

10. "Children's Language and Experience: A Place to Begin," Coordinating Reading Instruction, Helen Robinson (ed.), Scott Foresman, Glenview, 1971, pp. 46–52.

11. "Linguistics and Reading," Encyclopedia of Education, Lee C. Deighton, (ed.), Macmillan, 1971.

12. "Psycholinguistics and Reading," Proceedings of the Maryland Reading Institute, 1971.

13. "The Reading Process: Theory and Practice," Language and Learning to Read: What Teachers Should Know About Language, Hodges and Rudorf, (eds.), Houghton-Mifflin, 1972, pp. 143–59.

14. "Testing in Reading: A General Critique" Accountability and Reading Instruction, Robert Ruddell, Editor, Urbana, IL: NCTE, 1973.

15. "Strategies for Increasing Comprehension in Reading," Improving Reading in the Intermediate Years, Robinson, H., (ed.), Glenview, IL: Scott Foresman and Co., 1973, pp. 59–71

Also available as a separate monograph, Scott Foresman, 1974.

16. "The Reading Process", Proceedings of the Sixth Western Symposium on Learning: Language and Reading, Bellingham, WA, 1975.

17. "Miscue Analysis: Theory and Reality in Reading," New Horizons in Reading, Proceedings of Fifth IRA World Congress on Reading, Merritt, John E., (ed.), Newark, DE: International Reading Association, 1976, pp. 15–26.

18. "Linguistically Sound Research in Reading," Improving Reading Research, Farr, Roger, Weintraub, and Tone, (eds.), Newark, DE: IRA, 1976, pp. 89–100.

19. "What's Universal About the Reading Process," Proceedings of 20th Annual Convention of the Japan Reading Association, Tokyo, 1976.

20. "Manifesto for a Reading Revolution," Malcolm Douglas, (ed.), 40th Yearbook Claremont Reading Conference, 1976, pp. 16–28.

21. "What We Know About Reading," Allen, P.D. and Watson, D., (eds.), Findings of Research in Miscue Analysis: Classroom Implications, ERIC-NCTE, 1976, pp. 57–69.

22. "The Goodman Taxonomy of Reading Miscues," Allen, P.D. and Watson, D., (eds.), Findings of Research in Miscue Analysis: Classroom Implications, ERIC-NCTE, 1976, pp. 157–244.

23. and Yetta M. Goodman, "Reading and Reading Instruction: Insights from Miscue Analysis," Watson, K.D. and Eagleson, R.D., (eds.), English in Secondary Schools: Today & Tomorrow, Sydney: English Teachers Association of New South Wales, 1977, pp. 254–59.

24. and Carolyn Burke, "Reading for Life: The Psycholinguistic Base" Conference Proceedings Reading: Curriculum Demands-Towards Implementing the Bullock Report, London, England: Ward Lock Educational, 1977.

25. "Bridging the Gaps in Reading: Respect and Communication," Harste, J. and R. Carey, (eds.), New Perspectives on Comprehension, Bloomington, Indiana University, October, 1979.

26. with Yetta M. Goodman and Barbara Flores, "Reading in the Bilingual Classroom: Literacy and Biliteracy," Rosslyn, VA: National Clearinghouse for Bilingual Education, 1979.

27. "Needed for the '80's: Schools that Start Where Learners Are," Needs of Elementary and Secondary Education in the 1980s; Sub-committee on Elementary Secondary and Vocational Education House of Representatives, 96th Congress, Washington: GPO January 1980.

28. "El proceso lector en ninos normales," Bravo Valdiviesco, Luis, (ed.), El Nino con Dificultades para Aprender, Santiago de Chile: UNICEF/Pontificia Universidad Catolica, 1980.

29. "Linguistic Diversity, Teacher Preparation and Professional Development," G. Smitherman, Editor, Black English and the Education of Black Children Youth, Center for Black Studies, Wayne State University, Detroit, MI, 1981, pp. 171–89.

30. "Miscue Analysis and Future Research Directions," Huddleson, Sarah, (ed.), Learning to Read in Different Languages, Linguistics and Literacy, Series: 1, Center for Applied Linguistics, Washington, 1981.

31. "Language Development: Issues, Insights, and Implementation" Goodman, Haussler, and Strickland, (eds.), Oral and Written Language Development Research: Impact on the Schools, NCTE & IRA, 1982.

32. "El proceso de lectura: consideraciones a traves de las lenguas y del desarrollo," E. Ferreiro and M. Gomez Palacio, (eds.), Nuevas Perspectivas Sobre Los Procesos de Lectura y Escritura, Mexico Editorial Siglo XXI, 1982, pp. 13–28.

33. "The Reading Process, A Multi-Lingual Developmental Perspective," K. Tuunainen and A. Chiaroni, (eds.), Full Participation, Proceedings of the Second European Conference on Reading, Joensuu Finland, 1982.

34. and Yetta M. Goodman "A Whole-Language Comprehension-Centered View of Reading Development," L. Reed and S. Ward, (eds.), Basic Skills: Issues and Choices, Vol. 2, St. Louis: Cemrel, 1982, pp. 125–134.

35. "On Research and the Improvement of Reading," M. Douglas, (ed.), Forty-seventh Yearbook of the Claremont Reading Conference, Claremont Graduate School, 1983, pp. 28–36.

36. "A Conversation with Kenneth Goodman," L. Rainsberry, (ed.), and Producer, Out of the Shadows, guide accompanying three program video series of the same name, Toronto: TV Ontario, 1983, pp. 17–20.

37. and Y. Goodman "Everything You Wanted to Know But Didn't Have the Opportunity to Ask," L. Rainsberry, (ed.), and Producer, Out of the Shadows, guide accompanying three program video series of the same name, Toronto: TV Ontario, 1983, pp. 28–44.

38. "Unity in Reading," Olives Niles and Alan Purves, (eds.), Becoming Readers in a Complex Society, 83rd Yearbook of the National Society for the Study of Education, 1984.

Also in Singer and Ruddell, Theoretical Models & Processes of Reading, 3rd Edition, Newark, DE: International Reading Association, 1985.

Also in Portuguese as "Unidad na Leitura," in Letras de Hoje, 12/1991, No. 86, pp. 9–44.

Also in German as “Lesen - ein transaktionaler ProzeB,” Konstruktionen der verstandigung, Luneburg: Universitat Luneburg, 1997, pp. 103–132.

39. "Literacy: for Whom and for What," Makhan L. Tickoo, (ed.), Language in Learning, Singapore: SEAMEO Regional Language Centre, 1986.

40. "A Holistic Model of Reading," Trondhjem, Editor, Aspects in Reading Processes, 12th Danavox Symposium, Klarskovgard, Denmark, 1986.

41. "Foreword" Making Connections with Writing, Mary and Chisato Kitagawa, Portsmouth, NH: Heinemann, 1987.

42. "Teachers Detechnologizing Reading," Dorothy J. Watson, (ed.), Ideas and Insights, Urbana, IL: NCTE, 1987, pp. x-xi.

43. "Reading for Life: the Psycholinguistic Base," Reading Concerns: Selected Papers from UKRA Conferences 1972–1980, London: UKRA, 1988.

44. "Language and Learning: Toward a social-Personal View," Proceedings of the Brisbane Conference on Language and Learning, July, 1988.

45. "Afterword," Jane L. Davidson, (ed.), Counterpoint and Beyond, Urbana, IL: NCTE, 1988, pp. 105–108.

46. "Language Development: Issues, Insights and Implementation," G. Pinnell and M. Matlin, (eds.), Teachers and Research: Language Learning in the Classroom, IRA, 1989, pp. 130–141.

47. with Yetta Goodman "Vygotsky in a Whole Language Perspective," Vygotsky and Education, Luis Moll, (ed.), Cambridge University Press, 1990, pp. 223–250.

48. "The Whole Language Curriculum," Hydrick, J, and N. Wildermuth, (eds.), Whole Language: Empowerment at the Chalk Face, New York: Scholastic, 1990, pp. 191–211.

49. with Yetta M. Goodman "Our Ten Best Ideas for Reading Teachers," Fry, E., (ed.), 10 Best Ideas for Reading Teachers, Menlo Park, CA: Addison-Wesley, 1991, pp. 60–64.

50. "Whole Language: What Makes it Whole," Power, B. and R. Hubbard, Literacy in Process, Portsmouth, NH: Heinemann, 1991.

51. "The Teacher Interview" Toby Kahn Curry and Debra Goodman, An interview by Yetta Goodman, Commentary by Ken Goodman, Atwell, N., (ed.), Workshop 3: The Politics of Process, Portsmouth, NH: Heinemann, 1991, pp. 81–93.

52. with Yetta M. Goodman "Whole Language: A Whole Educational Reform," Schools of Thought, Pathways to Educational Reform, Cleveland, OH: North American Montessori Teachers' Association, Vol. 16:2, Spring, 1991, pp. 59–70.

53. "Whole Language Research: Foundations and Development," Samuels, S. Jay and A. Farstrup, (eds.), What Research Has To Say About Reading Instruction, 2nd edition, Newark, DE: International Reading Association, 1992.

Also in Japanese: Horu Rangegi, (ed. & translated) by Takashi Kuwabara, Tokyo: Kokudo sha, 1992, pp. 112–157.

54. "A Question About the Future," Questions & Answers About Whole Language, Orin Cochrine, (ed.), Katonah, NY: Richard C. Owen, 1992, pp. 137–40.

55. "Forward," Whitin, David J. and Sandra Wilde, Read Any Good Math Lately? Portsmouth, NH: Heinemann, 1992, pp. xi-xii.

56. with D. Freeman "What's Simple in Simplified Language?," Simplification: Theory and Application, M.L. Tickoo (ed.), Singapore:SEAMEO Regional Language Centre, 1993, pp. 69–81.

57. "Ponencias Primero Conferencia", Memorias Del Primer Congreso de las Americas sobre Lectoescritura, Maracaibo, Venezuela: Universidad de Los Andes, 1993, pp. 4–15.

58. "El Lenguaje Integral Como Filosofia Educativa", Memorias Del Primer Congreso de las Americas sobre Lectoescritura, Maracaibo, Venezuela: Universidad de Los Andes, 1993, pp. 16–29.

59. with Yetta M. Goodman "Vygotsky desde la perspective del lenguaje total (whole-language)" Vygotsky Y La Educaci�n, Luis Moll (ed.), M�ndez de And�s: Aique Grupo Editor S.A., 1993, pp. 263–292. Spanish translation of "Vygotsky in a Whole Language Perspective" in Vygotsky and Education.

60. with Yetta M. Goodman "To Err Is Human: Learning about Language Processes by Analyzing Miscues," Theoretical Models and Processes of Reading, 4th Edition, Robert B. Ruddell, Ruddell, M.R., & Singer, H. (eds.), Neward, DE: International Reading Association, 1994.

61. "Reading, Writing and Written Texts: A Transactional Sociopsycholoinguistic View," Theoretical Models and Processes of Reading, 4th Edition, Robert B. Ruddell, Ruddell, M.R., & Singer, H. (eds.), Newark, DE: International Reading Association, 1994.

62. "Universals in Reading: A Transactional Socio-Psychoinguistic Model of Reading, Writing and Texts," A summary by Patrick Gallo, Singapore: Report of the Regional Seminar on Reading and Writing Research: Implications for Language Education, 1994, p. 6.

63. "Forward: Lots of Changes, But Little Gained" Basal Readers: A Second Look, Patrick Shannon & Goodman, K.S. (eds)., Katonah, NY: Richard C. Owen Publishers, 1994.

64. with Lisa Maras and Debbie Birdseye "Look! Look! Who Stole the Pictures From the Picture Book?," Basal Readers: A Second Look, Patrick Shannon & Goodman, K.S. (eds.), Katonah, NY: Richard C. Owen Publishers, 1994.

65. with Yetta M. Goodman "Preface," Leadership in Whole Language, The Principal's Role, York, ME: Stenhouse Publishers, 1995, pp.ix-xi.

66. with Kathryn F. Whitmore "Practicing What We Teach: The Principles That Guide Us," Whole Language Voices In Teacher Education, Kathryn F. Whitmore & Yetta M. Goodman (eds.), York, ME: Stenhouse Publishers, 1996, pp. 1–16.

67. with Richard Meyer and Yetta M. Goodman "Continuous Evaluation in a Whole Language Preservice Program" Whole Language Voices In Teacher Education, York, ME: Stenhouse Publishers, 1996, pp. 256–267.

68. "Lines of Print," Whole Language Voices In Teacher Education, York, ME: Stenhouse Publishers, 1996, pp. 134–135.

69. "The Boat in the Basement," Whole Language Voices In Teacher Education, York, ME: Stenhouse Publishers, 1996, pp. 136–137.

70. "Nonsense Texts to Illustrate the Three Cue Systems: "A Mardsan Giberter for Farfie," "Gloopy and Blit," and "The Marlup," Whole Language Voices In Teacher Education, York, ME: Stenhouse Publishers, 1996, pp. 138–140.

71. "Real Texts to Illustrate the Three Cue Systems: Downhole Heave Compensator," Whole Language Voices In Teacher Education, York, ME: Stenhouse Publishers, 1996, pp. 141–143.

72. "Real Texts to Illustrate the Three Cue Systems: Poison," Whole Language Voices In Teacher Education, York, ME: Stenhouse Publishers, 1996, pp. 144–145.

73. "Principles of Revaluing" Retrospective Miscue Analysis, Katonah, NY: Richard C. Owen, 1996, pp. 13–20.

74. with Yetta M. Goodman "Vygotsky em uma perspectiva da "linguagem integral" Vygotsky e an educa��ao, Luis Moll (ed.), Porto Alegre RS, Brazil: Artes M�dicas, 1996, pp. 219–224. Portuguese translation of "Vygotsky in a Whole Language Perspective" in Vygotsky and Education.

75. "Preface" Studies in Miscue Analysis An Annotated Bibliography, Newark, DE: International Reading Association, 1996, pp.iv-x.

76. "Oral and Written Language: Functions and Purposes" Many Families, Many Literacies An International Declaration of Principles, Denny Taylor (ed.), Portsmouth, NH: Heinemann, 1997, pp. 43–46.

77. With Yetta Goodman, “Forward” multiple voices, multiple texts, Dornan, R., Rosen, L, and Wilson, M. Portsmouth, NH: Boynton/Cook Publishers Heineman, 1997, pp. ix-xi.

78. �Por qu� es importante el lenguaje? Una Historia Sin Fin. Crear Y Recrear Texto, Gabriela Yncl�n (ed.), M�xico, D.F., 1997, pp. 15–17.

79. With Yetta M. Goodman, “To Err Is Human: Learning about Language Processes by Analyzing Miscues,”Reconsidering a Balanced Approach to Reading, Constance Weaver (ed.), Urbana, IL: National Council of Teachers of English, 1998, pp. 101-123.

80. “California, Whole Language, and National Assessment of Educational Progress (NAEP),” Reconsidering a Balanced Approach to Reading, Constance Weaver (ed.), Urbana, IL: National Council of Teachers of English, 1998, pp. 467–491.

81. “The Phonics Scam: The Pedagogy of the Absurd,” Perspectives on Reading Instruction, Alexandria, VA: Association for Supervision and Curriculum Development, 1998, pp. 27–31.

82. “The Reading Process,” Encyclopedia of Language and Education, Volume 2, Viv Edwards and Corson, David (eds.), Dordrecht, The Netherlands: Kluwer Academic Publishers, 1997, pp. 1–7.

83. With Catherine Buck, “Dialect Barriers to Reading Comprehension Revisited,” Literacy Instruction for Culturally and Linguistically Diverse Student, Newark: DE: International Reading Association, 1998, pp. 139–145.

84. “I Didn't Found Whole Language,” Distinguished Educators on Reading, Nancy Padak. . . (et al.), (eds.), Newark, DE: International Reading Association, 2000, pp. 2–19.

85. “Update: Forward 8 Years and Back a Century,” Distinguished Educators on Reading, Nancy Padak. . . (et al.), (eds.), Newark, DE: International Reading Association, 2000, pp. 20–27.

86. With Yetta Goodman and Prisca Martens, “Text Matters: Readers Who Learn with Decodable Texts” 51st Yearbook of the National Reading Conference, Oak Creek, Wisconsin: National Reading Conference, Inc., 2002, pp. 186–203.

87. “Whole Language and Whole-Language Assessment” Literacy in America An Encyclopedia of History, Theory, and Practice, Vol. 2 N-Z, Barbara Guzetti, (ed.), Santa Barbara, CA: ABC Clio, 2002, pp. 673–677.

88. With Yetta M. Goodman, “To Err Is Human: Learning About Language Processes by Analyzing Miscues” Theoretical Models and Processes of Reading, 5th Edition, Robert B. Ruddell and Unrau, Norman J. (Eds.), Newark, DE: International Reading Association, 2004, pp 620–639.

Reviews

1. The Psychology of Language Thought and Instruction, Readings by DeCecco in Journal of Reading, Vol. 11:8, May 1968, pp. 648–50.

2. "Research Critique: Oral Language of Kindergarten Children," Elementary English, Vol. 43:8, December, 1966, pp. 897–900.

3. Buros, "Reading Tests and Reviews," American Educational Research Journal, January, 1971, pp. 169–71.

4. Linguistics in Language Arts and Reading, Journal of Reading, November, 1972.

5. Williams, Hopper, and Natalicio, The Sounds of Children, Reading Teacher, Vol. 31:5, February, 1978, pp. 578–80.

School Materials

Co-author, Scott Foresman Reading Systems: Scott Foresman, Levels 1-21 (Grades K-6), 1971–73. Levels 22–27, 1974. Revised Edition, Chicago: Reading Unlimited, Levels 1-27, 1976.

Research Reports

1. A Study of Children's Behavior While Reading Orally, Final Report, Project No. S-425, Contract No. OE-6-10-136, U.S. Department of Health, Education and Welfare, Office of Education, Bureau of Research.

2. A Study of Oral Reading Miscues that Result in Grammatical Re-Transformations, Final Report, Project No. 7-E-219, Contract No. OEG-O-8-070219-2806 (010), U.S. Department of Health, Education and Welfare, Office of Education, Bureau of Research.

3. Theoretically Based Studies of Patterns of Miscues in Oral Reading Performance, Final Report, Project No. 9-0775, Grant No. OEG-0-9-320375-4269, U.S. Department of Health, Education and Welfare, Office of Education, Bureau of Research, May, 1973. Abstracted in ERIC.

4. with William Page, Reading Comprehension Programs: Theoretical Bases of Reading Comprehension Instruction in the Middle Grades, Contract No. NIE C-74-0140, National Institute of Education, U.S. Department of Health, Education and Welfare, August, 1976.

5. Reading of American Children Whose Reading is a Stable, Rural Dialect of English or Language Other Than English, Grant No. NIE-C-00-3-0087, National Institute of Education, U.S. Department of Health Education and Welfare, August, 1978.

6. with Suzanne Gespass, Analysis of Text Structures as They Relate to Patterns of Oral Reading Miscues, Project NIE-G-80-0057, National Institute of Education, Department of Health, Education and Welfare, February, 1982.

AUDIO/VISUAL TAPES

with Janet Emig and Yetta M. Goodman, Interrelationships of Reading and Writing, NCTE No. 7250R.

with Barbara Bonder and Jean Malmstram, Psycholinguistics and Reading, NCTE No. 73276R.

and Yetta M. Goodman, Reading for Meaning: The Goodman Model, Sydney: Film Australia, 1977,

(16mm film.)

with DeWayne Triplett and Frank Greene, The Right Not To Read, NCTE No. 71311R.

with Yetta M. Goodman, Watching Children Reading, BBC, London, 1986.

What's Whole in Whole Language?, ASCD, Alexandria, Virginia, 1992.

with Constance Kamii, Constructivism & Whole Language, ASCD, Alexandria, Virginia, 1993.

Occasional Papers

Program in Language and Literacy

College of Education

University of Arizona, Tucson

No. 1 with Yetta Goodman, A Whole-Language Comprehension Centered View of Reading Development, February, 1981.

No. 2 with F.V. Gollasch, Word Omissions in Reading Deliberate and Non-Deliberate: Implications and Applications, March, 1981.

No. 3 with Bess Altwerger, Studying Text Difficulty Through Miscue Analysis, June, 1981.

No. 6 with Lois Bridges Bird, On the Wording of Texts: A Study of Intra-Text Word Frequency, March, 1982.

No. 7 with Suzanne Gespass, Text Features as they Relate to Miscues: Pronouns, March, 1983.

No. 8 Text Features as they Relate to Miscues: Determiners, July, 1983.

No. 15 with G. Williams and J. David, Revaluing Troubled Readers, February, 1986.

No. 16 with Brown, J. and Marek, A. Annotated Chronological Miscue Analysis Bibliography, August, 1994.

References 

University of Arizona faculty
Psycholinguistics
1927 births
2020 deaths
Presidents of the International Literacy Association